Cicindela chinensis, commonly known as the Chinese tiger beetle, is a species of Cicindela native from Asia.

Subspecies
Cicindela chinensis
Cicindela chinensis japonica - Japanese Tiger Beetle
Cicindela chinensis flammifera

References

External links

chinensis
Beetles described in 1774
Taxa named by Charles De Geer
Beetles of Asia

no:Cicindela japonica
vi:Cicindela japonica